The Soup Dragons were a Scottish alternative rock band of the late 1980s and early 1990s. Named after a character in the 1970s children's television series Clangers, the group is best known for its cover of the Rolling Stones' song "I'm Free", which was a Top 5 hit in the United Kingdom in 1990; and "Divine Thing", a Top 40 hit in the United States in 1992.

History
The Soup Dragons formed in Bellshill, a town near Motherwell, in 1985. The line up was Sean Dickson (vocals, lead guitar), Jim McCulloch (guitar, second voice) who replaced Ian Whitehall, and Sushil K. Dade (bass). The original drummer Ross A. Sinclair left the group after the first album This Is Our Art to pursue a career in art, and he was replaced by Paul Quinn. Most of their songs were written by Sean Dickson.

The Soup Dragons recorded their first demo tape You Have Some Too after playing a few local gigs, and this was followed by a flexi disc single "If You Were the Only Girl in the World". They signed to The Subway Organization in early 1986, and their first EP (The Sun in the Sky was Buzzcocks-inspired pop punk. The band's breakthrough came with their second single for Subway, "Whole Wide World", which reached No. 2 on the UK Independent Chart in 1986. Dickson and McCulloch also played in BMX Bandits at this time. The band were signed by former Wham! co-manager Jazz Summers' label Raw TV with further indie hits (and minor UK Singles Chart hits) following during 1987 and 1988. Over the course of six singles (the first three collected in 1986 on a US-only compilation, Hang Ten), they gradually developed a complex rock guitar sound, which culminated in their first album This Is Our Art, now signed to major label Sire Records. After one single from the album - "Kingdom Chairs" - was released, they then returned to original label Raw TV and Big Life Records.

In the year after This Is Our Art, The Soup Dragons' sound underwent a change from an indie rock sound, to the rock-dance crossover sound; this was mainly due to being without a drummer and buying a sampler and drum machine and experimenting with sound with the release of the album Lovegod.  This change can be attributed to the rise of the ecstasy-fueled acid house rave scene in the UK. In 1990, they released "I'm Free", their most successful hit single in the UK and an up-tempo cover of a Rolling Stones song with an added toasting overdub by reggae star Junior Reid, which reached No. 5. The single later appeared on the soundtrack for the movie The World's End (2013).

Subsequent albums continued in the band's own style and in 1992, they enjoyed their biggest US hit with "Divine Thing", which reached No. 26 on the Billboard Hot 100. It also hit No. 3 on the Modern Rock chart and its video was nominated by MTV as one of the year's best, though beaten by Nirvana's "Smells Like Teen Spirit".

The Soup Dragons disbanded in 1995. Paul Quinn joined Teenage Fanclub. Sushil K. Dade formed the experimental post rock group Future Pilot A.K.A. and is now a producer for BBC Radio 3. Sean Dickson formed The High Fidelity and has released many records and albums with other artists like Bootsy Collins, Yoko Ono, Crystal Waters and David McAlmont. Jim McCulloch joined Superstar, wrote and recorded music with Isobel Campbell, and formed the folk group Snowgoose. Ross A. Sinclair had a successful career in art, winning a number of international awards and becoming a Research Fellow at Glasgow School of Art, and still makes music to this day.

The story of The Soup Dragons is traced as part of the 2017 documentary Teenage Superstars.

Discography

Albums

Compilations
Hang Ten! (1987), Sire – compiles the tracks from the singles "Hang-Ten!", "Whole Wide World" and "Head Gone Astray"
20 Golden Greats (compilation, 2012)

Extended plays
Hang Ten! (1986)

Singles

References

External links
 The Soup Dragons at the BBC
 Soup Dragons interview on set of Mother Universe video, Oct 1990 by Chris Hunt
 trouserpress entry
 HiFi Sean Page

Scottish alternative rock groups
Madchester groups
Musical groups disestablished in 1995
Musical groups established in 1985
British indie pop groups
Scottish indie rock groups
Sire Records artists
People from Bellshill
1985 establishments in Scotland